Silvia Elena Radu (born 30 June 1935 in Pătroaia-Vale) is a Romanian sculptor, potter, and painter.

She graduated in 1960 from the Bucharest Academy of Fine Arts  She is the wife the sculptor Vasile Gorduz.

Her work is in the Tyler Collection of Romanian and Modern Art.

She is the author of monumental works in public spaces in Romania and of sculptures which can be found in public and private collections.

Art in public spaces:
1965 - "Legend of Master Manole" Herăstrău Park, Bucharest;
1986 - "Heroes memorial statue" Potlogeni;
1969 - "Environmental sculpture" Costinești;
1971 - "Neptune" marble sculpture, Neptun;
1994 - The "Saint George" bronze sculpture, St George Square, Timișoara.

Awards
1968 - the 2nd prize for sculpture of the Union of Artists,
1974 - the 2nd prize for monumental art;
1999 - Memory and Project Exhibition Award;
2003 - "Prometheus Opera Omnia" Award of the Anonymous Foundation, together with Vasile Gorduz.

References

Further reading 
 Entry for Silvia Radu on the Union List of Artist Names
 Silvia Radu on artnet

1935 births
Living people
20th-century Romanian women artists
21st-century Romanian women artists
Romanian sculptors
Romanian women sculptors
People from Dâmbovița County
Romanian painters
Romanian women painters